New Western Pomerania ( or Neu-Vorpommern) was that part of Western Pomerania that went to Prussia under the terms of the Congress of Vienna in 1815. 

The territory of New Western Pomerania corresponded to that area of earlier region of Swedish Pomerania that had been left after the Treaty of Stockholm in 1720; thus it covered Western Pomerania north of the Peene, including the island of  Rügen. The name New Western Pomerania and Rügen (Neuvorpommern und Rügen) was also used, which emphasised the territory of Rügen. As early as 1720, the area of Swedish Pomerania that had been ceded to Prussia was called, by contrast, Old Western Pomerania (Altvorpommern).

New Western Pomerania was part of the Prussian province of Pomerania and, from 1818, formed the government region of Stralsund, but for a time, retained a special legal status. For example, from the old councils (Stände) of New Western Pomerania, a new Regional Parliament for New Western Pomerania and Rügen (Kommunallandtag von Neuvorpommern und Rügen) was formed in 1823, which existed until 1881. The Pomeranian Provincial Parliament, also formed in 1823, was elected separately by New Western Pomerania, Old Western Pomerania and Eastern Pomerania (Hinterpommern). With the gradual loss of its special status, the name New Western Pomerania also became uncommon.

See also 
 History of Pomerania

References

Literature 
 Johannes Hinz: Pommern-Lexikon. Geographie, Geschichte, Kultur. Lizenzausgabe. Bechtermünz Verlag, Augsburg, 1996, p. 220.

Province of Pomerania (1815–1945)
History of Pomerania
Geography of Prussia